Battle Creek is a stream in the U.S. state of South Dakota. It is a tributary of Lake Campbell.

Battle Creek was named for a skirmish between Indians and incoming whites.

See also
List of rivers of South Dakota

References

Rivers of Lake County, South Dakota
Rivers of Moody County, South Dakota
Rivers of South Dakota